Emil Scaria (18 September 1838 – 23 July 1886) was an Austrian bass-baritone. Born in Graz, he studied at the conservatory in Vienna before making his debut in Pest in 1860; he sang the role of St. Bris in Les Huguenots. He was a failure, and abandoned the stage entirely in favor of further study; he selected Manuel García as his new teacher. Though he returned to the stage in Dessau, he did not see success until he sang at the Crystal Palace in London in 1862. In 1863, he appeared with the Leipzig Opera; in 1864, he was working in Dresden. He was engaged by the Vienna State Opera in 1872. In 1882, he created the role of Gurnemanz in Parsifal for Richard Wagner at Bayreuth. Scaria died in Blasewitz, in Germany, in 1886.

Roles

World premieres 
 1868 Franz von Holstein: Der Haideschacht – Königliches Hoftheater Dresden
 1882 Richard Wagner: Parsifal – Bayreuther Festspiele (Gurnemanz)

Repertoire

References
 David Ewen, Encyclopedia of the Opera: New Enlarged Edition.  New York; Hill and Wang, 1963.
 C. M. Gruber, H. Reitterer: Scaria, Emil (1840-1886), Sänger, Österreichisches Biographisches Lexikon 1815–1950, retrieved November 1, 2016

1838 births
1886 deaths
19th-century Austrian male opera singers
Operatic basses